Gibasis pellucida, also known as Tahitian bridal veil, is a trailing plant in the family Commelinaceae that is native to the West Indies, southwest Texas, Argentina and Mexico.

In horticulture, the plant is often mislabelled as the related species Gibasis geniculata.

Description
A creeping plant growing to 20cm or 50cm, it features thin stems and narrow green leaves that have a purple underside. Small and showy white flowers would appear in abundance over the plant in most part of the year.

Cultivation
Commonly grown as an ornamental plant in hanging baskets and as a groundcover, it flourishes in warmth and humidity, but it must be protected from direct sunshine and severe frost. It can readily root from cuttings.

References

pellucida
Flora of Mexico
Flora of Argentina
Flora of Texas